The RAe TEE II, later known as RABe EC, is a type of high-speed electric multiple unit trainset of the Swiss Federal Railways (SBB-CFF-FFS), which was used from the 1960s until the 1980s on several Trans Europ Express services. 

It was designed to be compatible with four different railway electrification systems (different voltages in the overhead lines), used by various countries in Europe, allowing it to operate on long international routes. Like all TEE trains, the RAe TEE II trainsets were equipped with first-class accommodation only.  A total of five trainsets were built, numbered 1051–1055.

Operation 

These trains were originally used on the following services:
 TEE Gottardo, Zürich – Milano 
 TEE Cisalpin, Milano – Paris 
 TEE Ticino, Milano – Zürich 

The trains ran in a 4-day circulation:
 Gottardo, Zürich – Milano, and Cisalpin, Milano – Paris 
 Cisalpin, Paris – Milano 
 Ticino, Milano – Zürich – Milano, and Gottardo, Milano – Zürich
 layover in Zurich 

From 30 May 1965, the southbound Gottardo started from Basel, but nevertheless the northbound train still terminated in Zürich.  This led to an empty run (every fourth day for any given trainset) from Zürich to Basel. From 30 September 1979, this section was only served on weekdays, and on 23 May 1982 it was withdrawn entirely. During the summers of 1974–1979 the Gottardo was extended from Milano to Genova (in both directions).

The Cisalpin was converted in 1974 to a locomotive-hauled train and the Ticino was discontinued, freeing up RAe sets for the following two TEE trains:

 TEE Edelweiss, Zürich – Brussels – Amsterdam
 TEE Iris, Zürich – Brussels

The last TEE Edelweiss ran on 26 May 1979, and the TEE Iris on 30 May 1981. The last international TEE until 1993—and the last TEE anywhere to use RAe TEE II trainsets—was the Gottardo, which ran as a Trans Europ Express for the very last time on 24 September 1988, from Milano to Zürich. 

After their use on TEE services ended, the RAe TEE II sets were converted to two-class trains, redesignated type RABe EC, repainted from red-and-cream to two-tone grey, and put into use on EuroCity services from Zürich to Milano (the EC Gottardo), Zürich to Stuttgart, and Lausanne to Milano (the EC Lemano and EC Lutetia). Their new livery earned them the nickname "grey mouse".  They were removed from EuroCity service in 1994 and retired from regular service altogether in late 1999.

See also
 Swiss locomotive and railcar classification

References

Other sources 
This article uses material from German Wikipedia.
 Louis-Henri Leyvraz: Die Vierstrom-Triebzüge RAe-TEE II 1051–1055 der SBB. In: Schweizer Eisenbahn Revue. 06/1988. Minirex AG, S. 207 (8 Seiten, 12 Abbildungen), 
 Maurice Mertens: Les Trans Europ Express (Seconde edition). La Vie du Rail, Paris 1987, 
 Maurice Mertens: Trans Europ Express. Alba-Verlag, Düsseldorf 1987, 
 Hans-Bernhard Schönborn: Die TEE-Züge der Schweiz. Luxuszüge für Europa. GeraMond, München 2002, 
 Christian Zellweger: TEE – Ikone der Luxuszüge. AS Verlag, Zürich 2003,

External links 

 Page about preserved RAe TEE II trainset 1053 at SBB Historic (Swiss Federal Railways preservation foundation)
 Page about RAe TEE II at TEE Classics
 Photos of RAe TEE II trainsets at railfaneurope.net

Multiple units of Switzerland